Sonay Kartal was the defending champion but chose not to participate.

Yuriko Miyazaki won the title, defeating Heather Watson in the final, 5–7, 7–6(7–5), 6–2.

Seeds

Draw

Finals

Top half

Bottom half

References

External Links
Main Draw

GB Pro-Series Glasgow - Singles